The name Willa has been used for two tropical cyclones in the eastern Pacific Ocean, and a similar name, Wila, has been used for one tropical cyclone in the central Pacific.

East Pacific Region:
 Tropical Storm Willa (1962) – developed south of the Baja California Peninsula, never threatened land.
 Hurricane Willa (2018) – formed near southwestern Mexico, attained Category 5 major hurricane strength before making landfall in Sinaloa at Category 3

Central Pacific Region:
 Tropical Storm Wila (1988) – formed well to the southeast of the Hawaiian Islands, never threatened land

Pacific hurricane set index articles